Blast Works: Build, Trade, Destroy, known in Europe as Blast Works: Build, Fuse & Destroy, is a side-scrolling shooter video game for the Wii based on the Microsoft Windows game Tumiki Fighters created by Kenta Cho.

Majesco Entertainment and Budcat Creations released the game on June 10, 2008 in North America. Blast Works' release date in Europe was delayed to April 3, 2009, and the Australian release date was said to be around May 2009.

The game features 3D graphics, with enemies and obstacles represented in the form of polygonal toy blocks and propellers. The game also introduces extensive editing tools for the player to make custom content such as entire levels from scratch.

Gameplay
The player controls an aircraft on a two-dimensional plane. As the player destroys enemies, their debris fall off the screen below. If the player manages to touch these pieces of debris with their ship before they disappear from the screen, these pieces affix themselves to the player's plane in the positions they were caught, providing extra mass and firepower.

The extra parts, which reanimate and continue to fire their own unique weapons, can serve as shields against enemy projectiles (each part breaks into pieces and falls off upon hit), and all of the augmentations can be retracted into the original ship.

There are a wide variety of different enemies, which provide varying patterns of fire and numbers of points.

TUMIKI Fighters

TUMIKI Fighters was first released in 2004. It is written in the D programming language, with graphics drawn with OpenGL. Unlike the rest of Kenta Cho's shooters, TUMIKI Fighters has specific levels, non-random enemy placement, and a definite ending. The game was released as free software.

The game's name is derived from the Japanese word , meaning "building blocks"; this word may also be romanized as tumiki.

Blast Works
On June 27, 2007, Majesco Entertainment issued a press release announcing a Wii version of TUMIKI Fighters, titled Blast Works: Build, Trade & Destroy.

Added to the game is a 2-4 player cooperative mode, ship and level editors, and a "Hangar," which allows players (while inside) to purchase various ship upgrades; the building itself can be defended from attackers, via the motion controls of the Wii Remote. WiiConnect24 elements are also featured in the game, including online leaderboards and the swapping of custom ships and levels among friends.

The game disc, in addition to Blast Works, also contains playable versions of rRootage, Gunroar, and Torus Trooper (other games made by Kenta Cho) as unlockables, in addition to the original TUMIKI Fighters itself.

Editor
Blast Works comes with a powerful editing tool that allows extensive customization to the game. Players can construct their own ships, enemies and bosses with the editor, as well create their own backgrounds.

When designing enemies, the player can manipulate projectile patterns, sound effects, movement patterns, hit boxes, and more in the Ship Editor portion of the Blast Works Editor. The player also has the option of fully customizing the ship that they play as. For example, the ship builder lets the player view their ship from many different angles, allowing them to add new pieces, such as wings or weapons, simply by adding shapes to their ship. The basic shapes can be combined to create even more complex constructs, and there are a few moving shapes the player can add to give their ship a bit more life. The player is also given full control over the size, shape, and color of any object they create. This ranges from their main ship to buildings created for custom levels and even enemy craft.

The level designer (the same tool the game's developers used to create the built-in levels that come with the game) also features powerful capabilities. The player can set the basics, such as color scheme or background, then drag and drop enemies into their custom level from either a list of pre-built enemies or custom ships previously created. The player can also set trigger events that can change the orientation of your ship, the behavior of enemy ships, or the movement of the game camera. The player can also add a number of different special effects to their level such as a Virtual Boy-like effect, which turns everything in the level to red and black, or a water effect, to make background oceans or the level itself appear underwater. After constructing a level, the player can preview it before importing it into the game.

Sharing content 
Majesco set up a website (www.blastworksdepot.com) specifically for players to upload (after registering) and download user-created levels, shapes, objects, and enemies from the website to their Wii. Users could browse by levels, enemies, or shapes, with all content including a thumbnail preview and a rating. That website has now since been defunct.

Reception 

Blast Works received "generally favorable reviews" according to the review aggregation website Metacritic.

It received multiple nominations from IGN in its 2008 video game awards, including Best Shooting Game and Most Innovative Design.

References

External links
Official Blast Works homepage
Blast Works Depot
Official Tumiki Fighters site

2008 video games
Majesco Entertainment games
Nintendo Wi-Fi Connection games
Horizontally scrolling shooters
Video games developed in the United States
Wii Wi-Fi games
Wii-only games
Multiplayer and single-player video games
Budcat Creations games